Left Over Ladies (also written as Leftover Ladies) is a 1931 American drama film starring Claudia Dell, Marjorie Rambeau and Walter Byron. Produced by Tiffany Pictures, it was originally going to be directed by Lloyd Bacon before Erle C. Kenton took over.

Synopsis
After a society divorce, Patricia Worth refuses any alimony from her wealthy husband and plans to make a living as a writer. She encounters a recently-divorced writer who has made success out of his book celebrating divorce, but is in truth distraught that his wife has left him. They apparently fall in love, but both their former partners - including Patricia's husband Ronny who has become entangled with a gold digger - decide they want them back.

Cast
 Claudia Dell as 	Patricia
 Marjorie Rambeau as 	The Duchess
 Walter Byron as Ronny
 Alan Mowbray as 	Jerry
 Rita La Roy as 	Vera
 Roscoe Karns as 'Scoop'
 Dorothy Revier as Amy
 Selmer Jackson as Churchill
 Franklyn Farnum as 	Benson
 Buster Phelps as 	Buddy
 Bill Elliott as 	Escort

References

Bibliography
 Blottner, Gene. Wild Bill Elliott: A Complete Filmography. McFarland, 2007.
 Cocchi, John. Second Feature: The Best of the B's. Carol Publishing Group, 1991.

External links
 

1931 films
1931 drama films
American drama films
Films directed by Erle C. Kenton
American black-and-white films
Tiffany Pictures films
1930s English-language films
1930s American films